D. carnea may refer to:

 Dalea carnea, a flowering plant
 Darwinia carnea, an evergreen shrub
 Dendronephthya carnea, a soft coral
 Duebenia carnea, a cup fungus